Colombian-American Gus Ocamposilva received most of his formal art training in Spain where he studied Murals at Massana School of Barcelona and painting procedures at Barcelona University, Spain. (1992–1995)

In the year 2000 Gus Ocamposilva moved permanently to the United States where he works with his wife Lina. In 2007 they were selected to install their first six feet height sculpture title "Reaching El Dorado" in Sioux Falls SculptureWalk, South Dakota.

They were invited by the City of New York to exhibit three of their 12 ft sculptures (“Dancers of the wind” Spring 2013) that were designed exclusively to be displayed along the East River Park Promenade in Manhattan and have installed monumental sculptures in cities such as: Chicago, Palm Desert, Atlanta, Miami and others.

Throughout the years they have worked in various media; clay, cast stone, resin, steel, stainless steel and aluminum. They have also incorporated LED lights into their pieces. Exploring all these different types of media has given them the opportunity to express themselves in multiple ways through their art, from tabletop size sculptures to 20 ft height sculptures that have been bought by different Cities and Private entities . Although they are always adding different textures, colors and accents to our artworks these unique features allow them to give their pieces a signature look.

They show in all their works their passion for live and nature. They see the world in countless colors, diverse and vibrant, and this is apparent in their creations. Dynamic and exciting, their artwork speaks of colors, magic and poetry.

They have earned numerous honors awards both in the U.S. and abroad and their commissioned monumental sculptures work can be found in public and private collections around the U.S.

Their bibliography includes articles in different national and international publications.

Public art projects 
 2020: "Laura's Flower" Sculpture H:20’x W: 12’x D:12’ City of Jacksonville, FL
 2020: "Heart of the Community” Sculpture H:8’x W: 80”x D:15”. Commissioned by City of Safety Harbor, FL. 
 2020: “Tree” Sculpture H:10’x W: 50”x D:50”. Coral Springs, FL
 2019: “Reaching for Knowledge” Sculptures 20’x8’x8’. St. Petersburg College, Clearwater, FL
 2018: “Queen of the Arts” Two Sculptures 15’x12”x2” each. Commissioned by the City of Las Vegas, NV
 2018: “Chicago” Sculpture 14’x10’”x20”. Chicago, IL
 2018: “Go Cubs” Sculpture 14’x7’x20”. Chicago, IL
 2018: “Arabesque” Sculpture 12’x15”x80”. Ocala, FL
 2018: “Saturn” Sculpture 80" x 56"x 27". Museum of Art DeLand, FL.
 2018: “Without Limits” Sculpture 15’x75”x20”. Broadway Armory Park. Chicago, IL
 2017: “Dancing in the rain” Sculpture 20’x80”x24”. Greeley, CO
 2017: “Moon Tower” SPACES Sculpture Trail. Huntsville, AL
 2017: “Twin Souls” SPACES Sculpture Trail. Madison, AL
 2017: “Sunset” SPACES Sculpture Trail. Madison, AL
 2017: “Magic Rain” Sculpture 34"x134'x18". Orlando, FL
 2017: “Dancer in the wind” Sculpture 12’x15”x80” Clearwater, FL
 2016: “Sunrise” Sculpture 84"x 120"x 20" . Stamford, CT
 2016 “Dancers” Sculptures 12’x15”x80” Gulfport, MS
 2016: “Reaching the Limits ” Sculpture 15’x75”x20” Orlando, FL
 2016: “Without limits” Sculpture 15’x75”x20”. Chicago, IL
 2016: “Magic Rain” Sculpture 34"x134'x18". Stamford, CT.
 2015: 'Moon Tower” Sculpture 12’x6’x6’. Chicago, IL
 2015: “Without limits” Sculpture 15’x75”x20” Ocala, FL
 2015: “Reaching to the Sky” Sculpture 14’x15”x80” Fort Myers, FL
 2015: "Sunset" Sculpture 84"x 120"x 20" Ocala, FL
 2015: “Under the Rain” Sculpture 34"x134'x18" Kingsport, TN
 2014: ”Blooming” Sculpture 12.5’x8’x8’ Intermodal Transportation Facility. Deland, FL.
 2015: ”Orchid” Sculpture 10’x6’x6’ Jupiter FL.
 2014: “Twin Souls” Sculpture 11’x5’x28”. Chicago, IL
 2014: “Sunset” Sculpture 84"x 120"x 20". Jupiter, FL
 2014: “Dolphins game” Sculpture 10’x5’x5’. Jupiter, FL
 2014: “Dancers of the Wind” Sculptures 12’x15”x80” Polk Museum of Art. Lakeland, FL
 2014: "Tulip" Sculpture 10' x 70" x 70" Yonkers, NY
 2014: "Saturn" Sculpture: 80" x 56"x 27"Yonkers, NY
 2014: “Sunset” Sculpture 85”x10’x20” Jupiter, FL
 2014: “Dolphins Game” 10’x5’x5’ Jupiter, FL
 2013: “Dancers of the wind” Three sculptures 12’x15”x80” Manhattan. N.Y
 2013: “Tree” sculpture:120”x50”x50” Museum of Art. Deland, FL
 2013: “Sunset“ Sculpture 84"x 120"x 20" Kingsport, TN
 2013: “Without Limits” Sculpture 15’x75”x20” El Paseo Ave. Palm Desert, CA
 2012: “Tulip” Sculpture 10’x55”x55” Downtown Clearwater, FL
 2012: "Sun Door" Sculpture 112" x 65" x 65" Charles Cohen Buffalo N.Y
 2012: “Wings” Sculpture 15”x7”x6”. King's Terrace complex. Miami, FL
 2012: "Sunset" Sculpture 84"x 120"x 20" Sims Lake Park Suwanee, GA
 2012: “Tree” Sculpture:120”x50”x50”. City Hall, Safety Harbor, FL
 2012:"Hummingbird" Sculpture: w:70"x h:80"x d:61" City of Mount Dora, FL
 2011: "Dance of the wind" Sculpture: 112"x65"x28".. Tarpon Springs, FL
 2011: "Blooming" Sculpture: 120"x 53"x 100". Denver, Co
 2011:"Tropic" Sculpture 114"x 66" x 26" Graham & Associates Phoenix, AZ
 2011: “Magic Rain” Sculpture 34"x134'x18" Suwanee, GA
 2011: “Dance of the wind” Sculpture, 112”x65”x28”. Pinnacle Housing, Tarpon Springs, FL
 2011: “Saturn” Sculpture 80“ x 56“ x27“ Columbus, GA
 2011: “Hummingbird” w:70"x h:91"xd:61" Boynton Beach, FL.
 2010: “Blue Gold”110ftx5.5ft Wastewater Treatment Facility Wall sculpture. Dunedin, FL
 2010: "Dance of the wind" Sculpture 112x65x28 . Tampa FL
 2010: “Nest”-Sculpture: 28 x17'x17 -Avera Hospital, Sioux Falls, SD
 2010: ”Dolphins Game”-Sculpture: -Lakewood Park Public Library, Fort Pierce, FL
 2009: “Sunrise”-Sculpture: 120' x80" x20" -Ferran Park, Eustis, FL
 2009: “Artistic treatment to end panels on stacks of bookshelves throughout the complex, Deltona Public Library”Volusia County. FL.
 2009: “Gods of the Rain”Sculpture 39 x69 x39 Boynton Beach, FL
 2009: Without Limits Sculpture 23 x 23 x 4 Sioux Falls Cancer Center. SD.
 2009: Reaching El Dorado Sculpture 30 x 80 x 20 Kissimmee, FL
 2008: Mr. Blues – I got rhythm Banners 19 x 48 Clearwater Jazz Festival
 2008: Dreamers Mural 25'x 18' Gardenville Community Center Tampa, FL
 2008: Anti Gang Mural 30'x 12' Town and County Recreation Center Tampa, FL
 2008: Without Limits Sculpture 23 x 23 x 4 Sioux Falls, South Dakota.
 2008: Last chance Sculpture 30 x 78 x 18 Grounds for Art, Cedar Rapids, Iowa.
 2008: Flight of the Butterflies Sculpture 46 x 41 x 6 Sioux Falls, SD
 2008: Latin Romance Banner 30 x 100 Westshore Expose Banner Program.Tampa.
 2007: Spirits of the Chicamocha Sculpture 46 x 41 x 6 Tampa, FL
 2007: Reaching El Dorado Sculpture 30 x 80 x 20 Sioux Falls, SD
 2006: Deep Roots Mural (40 x 8ft). Atlanta, GA.
 1998: Honor to Pablo Neruda Mural, 26 x 10ft. Colombia.

Awards and grants
 2015: “Award of Recognition”. City Hall Ocala, FL.
 2014:  DeLand Intermodal Facility Award of Recognition Best Sculpture FL .
 2012: “Best of the Show” Suwanee, GA
 2011: “Award of Recognition” Art in Public Places, Oak Ridge States and The Tarpon Springs Housing Authority, FL.
 2008: Professional Development Recognition Grant. Pinellas County, FL
 2008: Clearwater Cultural Affairs Artist Recognition Award of the Quarter, FL.
 2006: Hispanic Alliance of Tampa Bay Calendar 2006–2007
 2006: City Hall and Bureau of Cultural Affairs Grant. Atlanta, GA.
 2005: Merit Award in Sculpture, Washington Arts and Craft Show, D.C
 2004: Honorable Mention, Art on the Bluff, MI
 2003: First Place Overall, Bartow Blooming Art Festival, FL
 2002: Purchase Award, Columbus Art Festival, OH
 2002: Merit Award, Marion County Art Festival, FL
 1998: Miami Key Award, Art Miami Iberoamerican International Magazine. Miami, FL

References

Sources

Living people
Colombian sculptors
Colombian women sculptors
Year of birth missing (living people)